Pimelea brevifolia is a species of flowering plant in the family Thymelaeaceae and is endemic to the south-west of Western Australia. It is an undershrub or shrub with erect, elliptic leaves, and heads of white flowers surrounded by four involucral bracts.

Description
Flowering occurs from July to October.

Taxonomy and naming
Pimelea brevifolia was first formally described in 1810 by Robert  Brown in his book Prodromus Florae Novae Hollandiae et Insulae Van Diemen. The specific epithet (brevifolia) means "short-leaved".

In 1988, Barbara Lynette Rye described two subspecies of P. brevifolia in the journal Nuytsia, and the names are accepted by the Australian Plant Census:
 Pimelea brevifolia R.Br. subsp. brevifolia has egg-shaped involucral bracts and long hairs on the ovary part of the floral tube.
 Pimelea brevifolia subsp. modesta (Meisn.) Rye, previously known as Pimelea modesta Meisn. has elliptic involucral bracts short hairs on the ovary part of the floral tube.

Distribution and habitat
Subspecies brevifolia grows in shrubland in sandy soil between Lake Grace, Albany and Israelite Bay in the Coolgardie, Esperance Plains, Jarrah Forest and Mallee bioregions, and subspecies modesta grows in sand between Wubin, Lake Grace, Coolgardie and Norseman in the Avon Wheatbelt, Coolgardie, and Mallee bioregions of south-western Western Australia.

Conservation status
Both subspecies of Pimelea brevifolia are listed as "not threatened" by the Government of Western Australia Department of Biodiversity, Conservation and Attractions.

References

brevifolia
Malvales of Australia
Flora of Western Australia
Plants described in 1810
Taxa named by Robert Brown (botanist, born 1773)